Salcete (Konkani: Saxtti/Xaxtti) is a subdivision of the district of South Goa, in the state of Goa, situated by the west coast of India. The Sal River and its backwaters dominate the landscape of Salcete. Historically, the sixty-six settlements south of the Zuari River formed the original Salcette territory. Salcete forms a part of the bigger Konkan region that stretches along the western shoreline of peninsular India.

In erstwhile Portuguese Goa, the Salcette concelho (county) located in the Velhas Conquistas (Old Conquests) was co-terminous with the undivided Salcette territory (Salcete and Mormugaõ talukas). In 1917, the concelho  was bifurcated into the present-day talukas of Mormugao and Salcette. The contemporary Salcete taluka has been classified as a rurban area. Margao serves as the administrative headquarters of both Salcete taluka and the South Goa district.

Etymology 
"Salcete" is the modern anglicised spelling of the historical lusitanised version Salcette. This word "Salcette" has been derived from the Konkani word Saxtti; ;  (IPA: )—a corruption of the Sanskrit word ""; ṣaṭa-ṣaṣṭi—meaning "sixty-six". According to the Hindu mythology of the Konkan, the original sixty-six settlements of the Salcette territory were established by sixty-six Saraswat Brahmin clans who had emigrated here from North India. In Goan Konkani, the natives are referred to as Saxtticar or Xaxtticar; /;  (IPA:  or ). The Salcete Konkani dialect of southern Goa known as "Saxtti" is notably different from the "Antruzi" (Ponda) and "Bardescari" (Bardez) dialects of northern Goa.

History 
King Viramarmadeva of the Kadamba dynasty issued a copper-plate inscription in 1049 CE concerning a grant of a piece of land called Tudukapura in  Kudtarika agrahara of Chhat sathi desha. This inscription suggests that Chhat sathi refers to modern Salcete, known as "Sāṣṭī" in the local language.

Salcette territory

Historical Salcette 
The original sixty-six settlements of Salcette are as follows:

Contemporary Salcete 

Salcete taluka comprises nine comunidades: Benaulim, Betalbatim, Colva, Curtorim, Loutolim, Margao, Nuvem, Raia, and Verna.

The sub-district consists of two cities, eleven towns, and thirty-five villages as per the 2011 Census of India.

Notes

Citations

References

External links 

South Goa District : Census 2011 data

Taluks of Goa
Geography of South Goa district